The Municipality of Komenda is a municipality in the Upper Carniola region of Slovenia. The seat of the municipality is the village of Komenda.

Settlements
In addition to the municipal seat of Komenda, the municipality also includes the following settlements:

 Breg pri Komendi
 Gmajnica
 Gora pri Komendi
 Klanec
 Komendska Dobrava
 Križ
 Mlaka
 Moste
 Nasovče
 Podboršt pri Komendi
 Poslovna Cona Žeje pri Komendi
 Potok pri Komendi
 Suhadole
 Žeje pri Komendi

Twin municipalities
 Municipality of Križevci, northeastern Slovenia

References

External links

Municipality of Komenda on Geopedia
 Komenda municipal site 

 
Komenda
1999 establishments in Slovenia